The British Swimming Championships - 100 metres breaststroke winners formerly the (Amateur Swimming Association (ASA) National Championships) are listed below. The event was originally contested over 110 yards and then switched to the metric conversion of 100 metres in 1971.

Adrian Moorhouse equalled the world record of 1.01.49 sec in the 1990 men's final.

100 metres breaststroke champions

See also
British Swimming
List of British Swimming Championships champions

References

Swimming in the United Kingdom